Timesquare is a 2000 album and the second studio album by Marshmallow Coast

Track listing

References 

2000 albums
Marshmallow Coast albums